State Trunk Highway 144 (often called Highway 144, STH-144 or WIS 144) is a state highway in southeastern Wisconsin, United States, that runs roughly north–south from Slinger to Random Lake.

Route description
Starting at Interstate 41/US Highway 41 (I-41/US 41) at a diamond interchange, WIS 144 proceeds to travel northward. Also, the Kettle Moraine Scenic Drive runs concurrently with part of the highway. It travels adjacent to Big Cedar Lake. After that, in Nabob, the highway then meets WIS 33. At this point, WIS 144 turns east along WIS 33 while the latter continues straight. In West Bend, WIS 33/WIS 144 then meets US 45 at a diamond interchange. Then, in downtown West Bend, WIS 144 branches off northward along the riverfront of Milwaukee River. Then, it crosses above that river. Continuing on, it travels northeastward through Orchard Grove. It then begins to run concurrently with WIS 28 and then going through Boltonville before ending the concurrency. At this point, WIS 144 turns east, traveling through Silver Creek and Random Lake before intersecting WIS 57. At that point, the highway ends.

Major intersections

See also

References

External links

144
Transportation in Washington County, Wisconsin
Transportation in Sheboygan County, Wisconsin